The IWA World Heavyweight Championship was a professional wrestling world heavyweight championship in the Australian World Championship Wrestling promotion from its founding in 1964 until 1971.

Although a part of WCW, the championship carried the IWA initials, for the International Wrestling Alliance. The IWA was WCW's sanctioning body for its championships.

WCW joined the National Wrestling Alliance in August 1969, but still recognized this title as its world title. In 1971, the title was abandoned, the NWA Austra-Asian Heavyweight Championship was established as WCW's new top championship, and the NWA World Heavyweight Championship was recognized in WCW as the world title.

24 different men held the championship, combining for 51 individual title reigns.

Title history

See also

Professional wrestling in Australia
World Championship Wrestling (Australia)
IWA International Wrestling Australia

References

External links

World heavyweight wrestling championships
World Championship Wrestling (Australia) championships
Professional wrestling in Australia